Ituxi Vallis is a valley in the Elysium quadrangle of Mars, located at 25.4° N and 207° W.  It is 62 km long and was named after the Ituxi River in Brazil.

References

Valleys and canyons on Mars
Elysium quadrangle
Lava channels
Volcanism on Mars